Ken A. Esquibel (born June 30, 1959) is a former Democratic member of the Wyoming House of Representatives, representing the 41st district from 2007 to 2017.

Esquibel is the brother of Floyd Esquibel, also a former state legislator in Wyoming. He is Hispanic.

References

External links
Wyoming State Legislature - Representative Ken Esquibel official WY House website
Project Vote Smart - Representative Ken A. Esquibel (WY) profile
Follow the Money - Ken Esquibel
2006 2004 campaign contributions

Democratic Party members of the Wyoming House of Representatives
1959 births
Living people
Politicians from Cheyenne, Wyoming
Hispanic and Latino American state legislators
21st-century American politicians